The following is a list of Adelaide Football Club leading goalkickers in each season of the Australian Football League (AFL) and AFL Women's.

AFL

Multiple winners

AFL Women's

References
Adelaide Goalkicking Records

Goalkickers
Australian rules football-related lists